The Municipal Council is the legislative branch of the government of the municipality of Sucre, the constitutional capital of Bolivia. The council consists of eleven elected members, and it elects its own President, Vice President and Secretary.

Current council members
The members of the municipal council elected on May 3, 2021 are:

 Oscar Sandy (MAS)
 Yolanda Barrios (MAS)
 Rodolfo Avilés (MAS)
 Guadalupe Fernández (MAS)
 Eduardo Lora (R-2025)
 Melisa Cortés (R-2025)
 Antonio Pino (R-2025)
 Carmen Rosa Torres (R-2025)
 Jenny Montaño (C-A)
 Gonzalo Pallares (CST)
 Edwin González (Unidos)

Past council members

2010 election
The Municipal Council was elected in the regional election of April 4, 2010. The election was by proportional representation with the Pact of Social Integration and the Movement Towards Socialism gaining the largest and second largest shares of the vote.

The council elected in April 2010 and seated in late December 2010 is as follows:

References

Sucre
Bolivia